Rosularia cypria is a tufted perennial with grey-green, sticky-downy spoon-shaped fleshy leaves, 3–4 cm long, in a loose rosette above an often bare basal trunk; flowering stems to 20 cm, carrying a few more similar leaves; flowers in terminal sprays to 12 cm long with leaf like bracts of diminishing size; calyx densely glandular with 5 deep-cut, broad, lobes forming a 5-angled pyramid; corolla-lobes white, recurved, 8–10 mm long with slender points; fruits comprising 5 papery, many-seeded follicles, circa 4 mm. Flowers from April to July. Common name Kıbrıs Göbekotu.

Habitat
Frequent on limestone cliffs and walls, usually north-facing, at middle-to-high altitudes.

Distribution
Along the Kyrenia Range from Lapta to Yayla. Endemic to Northern Cyprus.

References

External links
http://www.theplantlist.org/tpl1.1/record/tro-8903147
http://www.natureofcyprus.org/uploadimages/Rosulariacypria600450st.jpg
http://colnect.com/en/stamps/stamp/304434-Holmboe_Rosularia_cypria-Plants-Northern_Cyprus

Endemic flora of Cyprus
Crassulaceae